Graham Harris (fourth ¼  – death unknown) was an English professional rugby league footballer who played in the 1960s. He played at club level for Featherstone Rovers (Heritage № 472), as an occasional goal-kicking , i.e. number 9, during the era of contested scrums.

Background
Graham Harris' birth was registered in Pontefract district, West Riding of Yorkshire, England.

Playing career
Harris made his début for Featherstone Rovers on Saturday 17 December 1966, he appears to have scored no drop-goals (or field-goals as they are currently known in Australasia), but prior to the 1974–75 season all goals, whether; conversions, penalties, or drop-goals, scored 2-points, consequently prior to this date drop-goals were often not explicitly documented, therefore '0' drop-goals may indicate drop-goals not recorded, rather than no drop-goals scored.

Challenge Cup Final appearances
Harris played  in Featherstone Rovers' 17-12 victory over Barrow in the 1966–67 Challenge Cup Final during the 1966–67 season at Wembley Stadium, London on Saturday 13 May 1967, in front of a crowd of 76,290.

Genealogical information
Graham Harris was the older brother of the rugby league footballer; Billy Harris.

References

External links
Search for "Harris" at rugbyleagueproject.org

1946 births
English rugby league players
Featherstone Rovers players
Place of death missing
Rugby league hookers
Rugby league players from Pontefract
Year of death missing